This article details the fixtures and results of the Bahrain national football team in 2012.

Schedule

Friendly matches

2014 World Cup qualification (Asia)

2012 West Asian Football Federation Championship

References

Bahrain national football team
2012 national football team results
2011–12 in Bahraini football
2012–13 in Bahraini football